Lahat is a town and the administrative capital of Lahat Regency in South Sumatra, Indonesia.

References

Regencies of South Sumatra
Regency seats of South Sumatra